Arthur Meier may refer to:

 Dutch Meier (1879–1948), baseball player 
 Arthur Meier (cross-country skier) (born 1925), Liechtenstein cross-country skier